Under the Portuguese Presidency of the Council of the European Union in the first half of 2021, the EuroNanoForum 2021 conference will address Nanotechnology and Advanced Materials as the key elements to guarantee the functioning, long term durability, safety, and environmental compatibility of several devices, machinery, and services.

The European Green Deal will also play a major role in this online event since the advanced materials will be fundamental for the transition to new and greener technologies and disruptive innovation that will spread successful new solutions across Europe and the world.

The EuroNanoForum 2021  will bring together experts across different sectors to identify policy options and priorities, to share insight on technical, industrial, and social challenges, to define the role of nano-enabled industries as well as their views and ideas about the part that science will take in the greener future.

This event is a collective effort of several actors encompassing researchers, innovators, industries, regions, public authorities, investors, and civil society, in the co-creation of innovative solutions and is organized by INL - International Iberian Nanotechnology Laboratory in collaboration with FCT - Portuguese Foundation for Science and Technology, ANI - National Association for Innovation, and NIA - Nanotechnology Industries Association.

Nanotechnology